David K. Young (April 20, 1907 – January 16, 1988) was an American competition swimmer who represented the United States at the 1928 Summer Olympics in Amsterdam, Netherlands.  Young swam for the gold medal-winning U.S. team in the preliminary heats of the men's 4×200-meter freestyle relay.  Under the Olympic swimming rules in force in 1928, however, he was not eligible to receive a medal because he did not compete in the relay event final.

Young was born in Atlanta, Georgia.  He attended the Georgia Institute of Technology, where he competed for the Georgia Tech Yellow Jackets swimming team in National Collegiate Athletic Association (NCAA) competition.  In 1927, he won the NCAA national championship in the 150-yard backstroke with a time of 1:44.0.

See also
 List of Georgia Institute of Technology alumni
 World record progression 4 × 200 metres freestyle relay

References

External links
 

1907 births
1988 deaths
American male backstroke swimmers
American male freestyle swimmers
Georgia Tech Yellow Jackets men's swimmers
Olympic swimmers of the United States
Swimmers from Atlanta
Swimmers at the 1928 Summer Olympics
20th-century American people